George Matthew Hornshaw (born 20 January 2000) is an English professional footballer who plays as a midfielder for Gainsborough Trinity.

Career
In November 2011, Hornshaw joined Scunthorpe United as an under-12. In 2018, after featuring in the EFL Trophy for Scunthorpe, Hornshaw signed his first professional contract with the club. In the 2018–19 season, Hornshaw joined both Farsley Celtic and Gainsborough Trinity on loan.

He was one of 17 players released by Scunthorpe at the end of the 2020–21 season.

On 28 July 2021, Hornshaw signed for Gainsborough Trinity having been released by Scunthorpe.

On 30 June 2022, Hornshaw returned to National League North club Farsley Celtic having previously spent time with the club on loan. In September 2022, Hornshaw returned to Gainsborough Trinity.

Career statistics

References

2000 births
Living people
Sportspeople from Beverley
Footballers from the East Riding of Yorkshire
English footballers
Association football midfielders
Scunthorpe United F.C. players
Farsley Celtic F.C. players
Gainsborough Trinity F.C. players
English Football League players
National League (English football) players
Northern Premier League players